Sacredly Agnezious is the third studio album by Indonesian singer Agnes Monica, released in 2009 by Aquarius Musikindo. Two versions of the album were made: the first contains ten songs and the second version was a limited edition containing thirteen songs.

About Sacredly Agnezious

"Sacredly means something really sacred and that it is more authentic, while Agnezious is an adjective me, which means something that is very me. So "Sacredly Agnezious" can be said as "It's all about me", for which I am involved in it."

Monica involved as producer of the album because she wanted more involvement in determining for what should be displayed in the album. In addition, she wanted to show her maturity as an artist. She explained that there are many famous musicians who participated in making the album.

Accolades
In 2009, Agnez won the Anugerah Musik Indonesia for her single Matahariku as Best Pop Solo Female Artist, and received nominated for Best R&B Production Work for Godai Aku Lagi. In 2010 the album were up for seven nominations at the Anugerah Musik Indonesia 2010. It won Best of the Best Album and Best Pop Album. Teruskanlah won the Best Pop Solo Female Artist category.

Track listing

Gold Version (Limited Edition)

External links
 Sacredly Agnezious by Agnes Monica on iTunes

2009 albums
Agnez Mo albums